David Huw Jones (1 July 1934 – 18 October 2016) was a Welsh Anglican bishop who served as the Bishop of St. David's from 1996 to 2001.

Ministry
His first pastoral appointment was as a curate at Aberdare from 1959 to 1961, followed by the curate of St Catherine's, Neath from 1961 to 1965, Vicar of Crynant from 1965 to 1969, then the Vicar of Cwmafan (Cwmavon)(Michaelston-Super-Avon) from 1969 to 1973. His next appointment was as the Sub-Warden of St Michael's College, Llandaff from 1974 to 1978. He also became a Lecturer in the Faculty of Theology at the University College of South Wales and Monmouthshire from 1974 to 1978; becoming Assistant Dean of Faculty from 1977 to 1978. He became a Diocesan Ecumenical Officer in 1979. He was appointed Dean of Brecon Cathedral and Vicar of Brecon, St Mary and Battle with Llanddew, in 1982, where he served until 1993.

Episcopal career
He was consecrated an Assistant Bishop of St Asaph in 1993. He was elected and enthroned Bishop of St David's in 1996. He retired at the end of 2001 and died on 18 October 2016.

References

1934 births
2016 deaths
Bishops of St Davids
Deans of Brecon Cathedral
20th-century bishops of the Church in Wales